Nepal's 77 districts are subdivided into localities known as village development committees and into municipalities. There were 3,157 VDCs in Nepal. District wise list of VDCs (most of the case not updated names) are as follows:

As of 10 March 2017, VDCs were dissolved and were replaced by Gaunpalikas. Gaupalikas means rural municipality.

Eastern Development Region

Mechi Zone

Ilam District
Amchok, Bajho, Barbote, Chamaita, Chisapani, Chulachuli, Danabari, Ebhang, Ektappa, Emang, Erautar, Gajurmukhi, Godak, Gorkhe, Jamuna, Jirmale, Jitpur, Jogmai, Kolbung, Lakshmipur, Lumbe, Mabu, Mahamai, Maimajhuwa, Maipokhari, Namsaling, Naya Bazar, Pashupatinagar, Phakphok, Phuyatappa, Puwamajwa, Pyang, Sakphara, Sakhejung, Samalpung, Sangrumba, Shanti Danda, Shantipur, Siddhithumka, Soyak, Soyang, Sri Antu, Sulubung, Sumbek

Jhapa District
Anarmani, Bahundangi, Baiagundhara, Balubari, Baniyani, Budhabare, Chakchaki, Chandragadhi, Charpane, Dangibari, Dhaijan, Dharmpur, Duhagadhi, Garamani, Gauriganj, Gherabari, Goldhhap, Haldibari, Jalthal, Jyamirgadhi, Kechana, Khajurgachhi, Khudunabari, Korobari, Kumarkhod, Lakhanpur, Mahabhara, Maheshpur, Panchganchi, Pathabhari, Pathariya, Prithivinagar, Rajgadh, Shantinagar, Sharanamati, Taghanduba, Topgachchi, Arjundhara

Panchthar District
Ranitar, Luwamphu, Yangnam, Nangin, Lungrupa, Ambarpur, Panchami, Subhang, Bharapa, Yasok, Rani Gaun, Mangjabung, Syabarumba, Aarubote, Sarangdanda, Rabi, Kurumba, Limba, Durdimba, Ektin, Memeng, Prangbung, Yangnam, Sidin, Nawamidanda, Imbung, Pauwa Sartap, Chilingdin, Aangsarang, Phaktep, Aangna, Olane, Hangum, Mauwa, Chyangthapu, Phalaicha, Oyam, Tharpu, Nagi

Taplejung District
Ambegudin, Ankhop, Chaksibote, Change, Dhungesaghu, Dummrise, Ekhabu, Hangdeva, Hangpang, Kalikhola, Khamlung, Khejenim, Khewang, Khokling, Lelep, Limbudin, Lingtep, Linkhim, Liwang, Mamangkhe, Nalbu, Nankholyang, Nidhuradin, Olangchung Gola, Paidang, Papung, Pedang, Phakumba, Phawakhola, Phulbari, Phurumbu, Sadewa, Sangu, Santhakra, Sawa, Sawadin, Sawalakhu, Sikaicha, Sinam, Surumakhim, Tapethok, Tellok, Thechambu, Thinglabu, Thukima, Thumbedin, Tiringe, Yamphudin

Koshi Zone

Bhojpur District
Aamtep, Annapurna, Baikuntha, Basikhola, Basingtharpur, Bastim, Bhubal, Bhulke, Boya, Champe, Changre, Charambi, Chaukidada, Chhinamukh, Dalgaun, Deurali, Dewantar, Dhodalekhani, Dobhane, Dummana, Gogane, Gupteshwar, Hasanpur, Helauchha, Homtang, Jarayotar, Khairang, Khatamma, Khawa, Kot, Kudak Kaule, Kulunga, Lekharka, Mane Bhanjyang, Nagi, Nepaledanda, Okhre, Pangcha, Patle Pani, Pawala, Pyauli, Ranibas, Sangpang, Sano Dumba, Shyamsila, Siddheshwar, Sindrang, Syamsila, Thidingkha, Thulo Dumba, Timma, Tiwari Bhanjyang, Walangkha, Yaku, Yangpang

Dhankuta District
Ahale, Ankhisalla, Arkhaule Jitpur, Basantatar, Belhara, Budhabare, Bhirgaun, Bodhe, Budhabare, Budi Morang, Chanuwa, Chhintang, Chungmang, Danda Bazar, Dandagaun, Hathikharka, Jitpur Arkhaule, Khoku, Khuwaphok, Kuruletenupa, Leguwa, Mahabharat, Marek Katahare, Maunabuthuk, Mudebas, Murtidhunga, Parewadin, Phaksib, Raja Rani, Tankhuwa, Telia, Vedatar

Morang District
Amaibariyati, Amardaha, Babiya Birta, Bahuni, Banigama, Baradanga, Bayarban, Bhaudaha, Budhanagar, Dainiya, Dangihat, Dangraha, Darbairiya, Drabesh, Govindapur, Hasandaha, Hathimudha, Hoklabari, Itahara, Jante, Jhapa Baijanathpur, Jhorahat, Jhurkiya, Kadamaha, Katahari, Kathamaha, Kerabari, Keroun, Lakhantari, Madhumalla, Mahadeva, Majhare, Matigachha, Motipur, Nocha, Patigaun, Pokhariya, Rajghat, Ramite Khola, Sidharaha, Sijuwa, Sinhadevi Sombare, Sisabanibadahara, Sisawanijahada, Sorabhaj, Tandi, Tankisinuwari, Tetariya, Thalaha, Warangi, Yangshila

Sankhuwasabha District
Ankhibhui, Bahrabise, Bala, Chepuwa, Dhupu, Diding, Hatiya, Jaljala, Kimathanka, Madi Mulkharka, Madi Rambeni, Makalu, Malta, Mamling, Manakamana, Mangtewa, Matsya Pokhari, Mawadin, Num, Nundhaki, Pangma, Pathibhara, Pawakhola, Savapokhari, Sisuwakhola, Sitalpati, Syabun, Tamaphok, Tamku, Yaphu

Sunsari District
Aekamba, Amaduwa, Amahibelaha, Aurabarni, Babiya, Bakalauri, Barahachhetra, Basantapur, Bharaul, Bhokraha, Bishnupaduka, Chadwela, Chhitaha, Chimdi, Dewanganj, Ghuski, Dumaraha, Gautampur, Hanshpokha, Harinagar, Haripur, Jalpapur, Kaptanganj, Khanar, Laukahi, Madheli, Madhesa, Madhuwan, Madhyeharsahi, Mahendranagar, Narshinhatappu, Pakali, Panchakanya, Paschim Kasuha, Prakashpur, Purbakushaha, Ramganj Belgachhi, Ramganj Senuwari, Ramnagar Bhutaha, Sahebganj, Santerjhora, Simariya, Sonapur, Sripurjabdi, Tanamuna

Terhathum District
Angdim, Basantapur, Chhate Dhunga, Chuhandanda, Dangpa, Hamarjung, Hawaku, Isibu, Jaljale, Khamlalung, Morahang, Okhare, Oyakjung, Panchakanya Pokhari, Phakchamara, Phulek, Pauthak, Sabla, Samdu, Sankranti Bazar, Simle, Solma, Sri Jung, Sudap, Sungnam, Thoklung

Sagarmatha Zone

Khotang District
Ainselu Kharka, Arkhale, Badahare, Badka Dipali, Bahunidanda, Bakachol, Baksila, Barahapokhari (VDC), Baspani, Batase, Bijaya Kharka, Buipa, Chhitapokhari, Chhorambu, Chipring, Chisapani, Chyandanda, Chyasmitar, Damarkhu Shivalaya, Dandagaun, Devisthan, Dharapani, Dhitung, Dikuwa, Diplung, Dipsung, Dorpa Chiuridanda, Dubekol, Dumre Dharapani, Durchhim, Hanchaur, Indrayani Pokhari, Jalapa, Jyamire, Kaule, Kharmi, Kharpa, Khartamchha, Khidima, Khotang Bazar, Kuvinde, Lamidanda, Lichki Ramche, Linkuwa Pokhari, Magpa, Mahadevasthan, Mangaltar, Mattim Birta, Mauwabote, Nerpa, Nirmalidanda, Nunthala, Patheka, Pauwasera, Phaktang, Phedi, Rajapani, Rakha Bangdel, Rakha Dipsung, Ratancha Majhagaun, Ribdung Jaleshwari, Ribdung Maheshwari, Salle, Santeshwar Chhitapokhari, Sapteshwar, Saunechaur, Sawakatahare, Simpani, Sungdel, Suntale, Woplukha, Wopung, Yamkhya

Okhaldhunga District
Baksa, Balakhu, Baraneshwar, Betini, Bhadaure, Bhussinga, Bigutar, Bilandu, Chyanam, Diyale, Gamnangtar, Harkapur, Jantarkhani, Kalikadevi, Kaptigaun, Katunje, Ketuke, Khiji Chandeshwari, Khijiphalate, Kuibhir, Kuntadevi, Madhavpur, Mamkha, Manebhanjyang, Moli, Mulkharka, Narmedeshwar, Okhaldhunga, Palapu, Patle, Phediguth, Phulbari, Pokhare, Pokli, Prapchan, Ragani, Rajadip, Raniban, Ratmata, Rawadolu, Serna, Srichaur, Singhadevi, Sisneri, Taluwa, Tarkerabari, Thakle, Thoksela, Thulachhap, Ubu, Vadaure, Yasam

Saptari District
Arnaha, Aurahi, Bainiya, Bairawa, Bakdhauwa, Bamangamakatti, Banarjhula, Banaula, Banauli, Barhmapur, Barsain, Basbiti, Bathnaha, Belhi, Belhi Chapena, Bhagawatpur, Bhardaha, Bhutahi, Birpur Barahi, Bishariya, Budebarsaien, Boriya, Brahmapur, Chhinnamasta, Dauda, Daulatpur, Deuri, Deurimaruwa, Dhanagadi, Didhawa, Diman, Gamhariya Parwaha, Goithi, Hardiya, Hariharpur, Haripur, Inarwa Phulbariya, Itahari Bishnupur, Jamuni Madhapura, Jandaul, Jhutaki, Kabilash, Kachan, Kalyanpur, Kataiya, Khadgapur, Khojpur, Ko. Madhepura, Kochabakhari, Koiladi, Kushaha, Lalapati, Launiya, Lohajara, Madhawapur, Madhupati, Mahadeva, Maina Kaderi, Maina Sahasrabahu, Malekpur, Maleth, Malhanama, Malhaniya, Manraja, Mauwaha, Nargho, Negada, Pakari, Pansera, Parasbani, Paterwa, Pato, Patthargada, Phakira, Pharseth, Phulkahi, Pipra (West), Portaha, Ramnagar, Rampur Malhaniya, Rautahat, Rayapur, Sankarpura, Sarashwar, Simraha Sigiyaun, Siswa Beihi, Sitapur, Tarahi, Terahota, Tikuliya, Tilathi, Trikola

Siraha District
Arnama Lalpur, Arnama Rampur, Aurahi, Badharamal, Barchhawa, Bariyarpatti, Basbita, Bastipur, Belaha, Bhadaiya, Bhagawanpur, Bhagawatipur, Bhawanpur Kalabanchar, Bhokraha, Bishnupur Pra. Ma., Bishnupur Pra. Ra., Brahmagaughadi, Chandra Ayodhyapur, Chatari, Chikana, Devipur, Dhodhana, Dumari, Durgapur, Gadha, Gauripur, Gautari, Govindapur Malahanama, Govindpur Taregana, Hakpara, Hanuman Nagar, Harakathi, Inarwa, Itarhawa, Itari Parsahi, Itatar, Janakinagar, Jighaul, Kabilasi, Kachanari, Kalyanpur Jabadi, Kalyanpur Kalabanchar, Karjanha, Kharukyanhi, Khirauna, Krishnapur Birta, Lagadi Gadiyani, Lagadigoth, Lakshminiya, Lakshmipur (Pra. Ma.), Lakshmipur Patari, Madar, Mahadewa Portaha, Mahanaur, Maheshpur Patari, Majhauliya, Majhaura, Makhanaha, Malhaniya Gamharia, Mauwahi, Media, Nahara Rigaul, Naraha Balkawa, Navarajpur, Padariya Tharutol, Pipra Pra. Dha., Pipra Pra. Pi, Pokharbhinda, Rajpur, Sakhuwanankarkatti, Sanhaitha, Sarashwar, Sikron, Sisawani, Sonmati Majhaura, Sothayan, Sukhachina, Tenuwapati, Thalaha Kataha, Thegahi, Tulsipur

Solukhumbu District
Baku, Bapha, Basa, Beni, Bhakanje, Bung, Chaulakharka, Chaurikharka, Chheskam, Deusa, Goli, Gorakhani, Gudel, Jubing, Jubu, Kaku, Kangel, Kerung, Khumjung, Lokhim, Mabe, Mukali, Namche, Necha Batase, Necha Bedghari, Nele, Panchan, Salyan, Sautang, Takasindu, Tapting, Tingla

Udayapur District
Aaptar, Balamta, Baraha, Barai, Basabote, Bhumarashuwa, Bhuttar, Chaudandi, Dumre, Hadiya, Hardeni, Iname, Jalpachilaune, Janti, Jogidaha, Katunjebawala, Khanbu, Laphagaun, Lekhani, Lekhgau, Limpatar, Mainamiani, Myakhu, Nametar, Okhale, Panchawati, Pokhari, Rauta, Risku, Rupatar, Saune, Shorung Chabise, Sirise, Sithdipur, Sundarpur, Tamlichha, Triyuga, Tapeshwari, Tawasri, Thanagaun, Thoksila, Valaya Danda, Yayankhu

Central Development Region

Janakpur Zone

Dhanusa District
Andupatti, Aurahi, Baphai, Bagchaura, Baheda Bala, Bahuarba, Bhatauliya, Balabakhar, Balaha Kathal, Balaha Sadhara, Ballagoth, Baniniya, Basahiya, Basbitti, Bateshwar, Bega Shivapur, Begadawar, Bhuchakrapur, Bhutahi Paterwa, Bindhi, Bisarbhora, Chakkar, Chora Koilpur, Debadiha, Deuri Parbaha, Devpura Rupetha, Dhabauli, Dhanauji, Dubarikot Hathalekha, Duhabi, Ekarahi, Ghodghans, Giddha, Gopalpur, Goth Kohelpur, Hansapur Kathpula, Harine, Hathipur Harbara, Inarwa, Itaharwa, Jhatiyahi, Jhojhi Kataiya, Kachuri Thera, Kajara Ramaul, Kanakpatti, Khajuri Chanha, Khariyani, Kurtha, Lagmamdha Guthi, Lakhauri, Lakkad, Lakshminibas, Lakshmipur Bagewa, Lohana Bahbangama, Machijhitakaiya, Mahuwa (Pra. Ko), Mahuwa (Pra. Khe), Mansingpatti, Mithileshwar Nikash, Mithileshwar Mauwahi, Mukhiyapatti Mushargiya, Nagarain, Nauwakhor Prashahi, Nunpatti, Pachaharwa, Papikleshwar, Patanuka, Paterwa, Paudeshwar, Phulgama, Pushpawlpur, Raghunathpur, Rampur Birta, Sapahi, Shantipur, Siddha, Singyahi Maidan, Sinurjoda, Sonigama, Suga Madhukarahi, Suganikash, Tarapatti Sirsiya, Thadi Jhijha, Tulsi Chauda, Tulsiyahi Nikas, Tulsiyani Jabdi, Yadukuha

Dolakha District
Alampu, Babare, Bhedapu, Bhirkot, Bhusapheda, Bigu, Bocha, Bulung, Chankhu, Chhetrapa, Chilankha, Chyama, Dadhpokhari, Dandakharka, Gairimudi, Gaurishankar, Ghang Sukathokar, Hawa, Japhe, Jhule, Jhyaku, Jugu, Kabhre, Kalingchok, Katakuti, Khare, Khupachagu, Laduk, Lakuri Danda, Lamabagar, Lamidanda, Lapilang, Magapauwa, Makaibari, Malu, Marbu, Mati, Melung, Mirge, Namdu, Orang, Pawati, Phasku, Sahare, Shailungeshwar, Sunakhani, Sundrawati, Sureti, Susma Chhemawati, Syama

Mahottari District
Anakar, Aurahi, Bagada, Bagiya Banchauri, Bairjiya Lakshminiya, Balawa, Banauli Donauli, Banauta, Basabitti, Bathnaha, Belgachhi, Bharatpur, Bhatauliya, Bijayalpura, Bramarpura, Damhi Marai, Dhamaura, Dharmapur, Dhirapur, Ekadarabela, Ekarahiya, Etaharwakatti, Gaidaha Bhelpur, Gonarpura, Halkhori, Hariharpur Harinagari, Hathilet, Hatisarwa, Khairbanni, Khakhana, Khaya Mara, Khopi, Khuttapipradhi, Kolhusa Bagaiya, Lakshminiya, Loharpatti, Mahadaiyatapanpur, Majhora Bishnupur, Manara, Matihani, Meghanath Gorhanna, Nainhi, Padaul, Parsa Pateli, Parsadewadh, Pashupatinagar, Phulahatta Parikauli, Phulakaha, Pigauna, Pipra, Pokharibhinda Samgrampur, Raghunathpur, Ramgopalpur, Ratauli, Sahasaula, Sahorawa, Samdha, Sarpallo, Shamsi, Sripur, Simardahi, Singyahi, Sisawakataiya, Sonama, Sonamar, Sonaum, Suga Bhawani, Sundarpur, Vangaha Prariya

Ramechhap District
Bamti Bhandar, Betali, Bethan, Bhadaure, Bhirpani, Bhuji, Bijulikot, Chanakhu, Chuchure, Dadhuwa, Daragaun, Deurali, Dhyaurali, Dimipokhari, Doramba, Duragau, Gelu, Goshwara, Gothgau, Gumdel, Gunsi Bhadaure, Gupteshwar, Hiledevi, Himganga, Khandadevi, Khaniyapani, Khimti, Kubukasthali, Lakhanpur, Majuwa, Makadum, Naga Daha, Namadi, Pakarbas, Pharpu, Phulasi, Piukhuri, Priti, Puranagau, Rakathum, Rampur, Rasanalu, Saipu, Sanghutar, Those, Tilpung, Tokarpur, Wapti

Sarlahi District
Achalgadh, Arnaha, Aurahi, Babarganj, Bagdaha, Bahadurpur, Balara, Bara Udhoran, Basantapur, Batraul, Bela, Belhi, Belwajabdi, Bhadsar, Bhagawatipur, Bhawanipur, Brahmapuri, Chandra Nagar, Chhataul, Chhatona, Dhana Palbhawari, Dhanakaul Purba, Dhangada, Dumariya, Gadahiyabairi, Gamhariya, Godeta, Gaurishankar, Harakthawa, Haripur, Haripurwa, Hathiyol, Hempur, Jamuniya, Janaki Nagar, Jingadawa, Kabilasi, Kalinjor, Khaiharwa, Khoriya, Kisanpur, Kodena, Lakshmipur Kodraha, Lakshmipur Su., Madhubangoth, Madhubani, Mahinathpur, Mailhi, Manpur, Masaili, Mirjapur, Mohanpur, Motipur, Musauli, Narayan Khola, Narayanpur, Netraganj, Naukailawa, Parsa, Parwanipur, Pharahadawa, Phulparasi, Pidari, Pidariya, Pipariya, Ramnagar Bahaur, Ranban, Raniganj, Rohuwa, Sakraula, Salempur, Sangrampur, Shahorwa, Shreepur, Sikhauna, Simara, Sisautiya, Sisaut, Shankarpur, Sohadawa, Sudama, Sundarpur, Sundarpur Choharwa, Tribhuwannagar

Sindhuli District
Amale, Arun Thakur, Bahuntilpung, Balajor, Baseshwar, Bastipur, Belghari, Bhadrakali, Bhiman, Bimeshwar, Bhimsthan, Bhuwaneshwar Gwaltar, Bitijor Bagaincha, Dadiguranshe, Dudbhanjyang, Hariharpur Gadhi, Harsahi, Hatpate, Jalkanya, Jarayotar, Jhangajholi Ratmati, Jinakhu, Kakur Thakur, Kalpabriksha, Kapilakot, Khang Sang, Kholagaun, Kusheshwar Dumja, Kyaneshwar, Ladabhir, Lampantar, Mahadevdada, Mahadevsthan, Mahendrajhayadi, Majuwa, Netrakali, Nipane, Pipalmadi, Purano Jhangajholi, Ranibas, Ranichauri, Ratnachura, Ratnawati, Shanteshwari, Siddheshwari, Sirthauli, Sitalpati, Solpathana, Sunam Pokhari, Tamajor, Tandi, Tinkanya, Tosramkhola, Tribhuvan Ambote

Bagmati Zone

Bhaktapur District
Bageshwari, Balkot, Balkumari, Bode, Changunarayan, Chapacho, Chhaling, Chittpol, Dadhikot, Duwakot, Gundu, Jhaukhel, Katunje, Lokanthali, Nagadesh, Nagarkot, Nankhel, Sipadol, Sirutar, Sudal, Tathali

Dhading District
Aginchok, Baireni, Baseri, Benighat, Bhumesthan, Budhathum, Chainpur, Chhatre Dyaurali, Darkha, Dhola, Dhusha, Dhuwakot, Gajuri, Ghussa, Goganpani, Gumdi, Jiwanpur, Jharlang, Jogimara, Jyamaruk, Kalleri, Katunje, Kebalpur, Khalte, Khari, Kiranchok, Kumpur, Lapa, Mahadevsthan, Maidi, Marpak, Mulpani, Nalang, Naubise, Phulkharka, Pida, Rigaun, Salang, Salyankot, Salyantar, Satyadevi, Semjong, Sirtung, Tasarphu, Thakre, Tipling, Tripureshwar

Kathmandu District
Aalapot, Band Bhanjyang, Bajrayogini, Balambu, Baluwa, Bhadrabas, Bhimdhunga, Budanilkantha, Chalnakhel, Chapali Bhadrakali, Chhaimale, Chobhar, Nepal, Chauketar Dahachok, Chunikhel, Daanchhi, Dakshinkali, Dhapasi, Dharmasthali, Gapalphedi, Gokarna, Goldhunga, Gongabu, Gothatar, Ichankhu Narayan, Indrayani, Jhor Mahankal, Jitpurphedi, Jorpati, Kabhresthali, Kapan, Khadka Bhadrakali, Kirtipur Chitubihar, Koteshwar, Lapsiphedi, Machhegaun, Mahadevsthan, Mahankal, Manmaiju, Matatirtha, Mulpani, Nanglebhare, Naikap Naya Bhanjyang, Naikap Purano Bhanjyang, Nayapati, Phutung, Pukhulachhi, Ramkot, Sangla, Satungal, Syuchatar, Sheshnarayan, Sitapaila, Sokhek, Sundarijal, Suntol, Talkududechaur, Thankot, Tinthana, Tokha Chandeshwari, Tokha Saraswati

Kavrepalanchok District
Anekot, Balthali, Walting, Baluwapatti Deupur, Banakhu Chaur, Batase, Bekhsimle, Bhimkhori, Bhumidanda, Bhumlungtar, Birtadeurali, Bolde Phediche, Budhakhani, Chalal Ganeshsthan, Chandeni Mandan, Chaubas, Chyamrangbesi, Chyasing Kharka, Dandagaun, Dewabhumi Baluwa, Devitar, Dhungkharka Bahrabise, Dhuseni Siwalaya, Dolalghat, Gairi Bisauna Deupur, Ghartichhap, Gokule, Gothpani, Indreshwar, Jaisithok Mandan, Janagal, Jyamdi Mandan, Kalati Bhumidanda, Kanpur Kalapani, Kartike Deurali, Katunje Besi, Kabhre Nitya Chandeshwari, Khahare Pangu, Kharelthok, Kharpachok, Khopasi, Kolati Bhumlu, Koshidekha, Kurubas Chapakhori, Kushadevi, Machchhegaun, Madan Kundari, Mahadevsthan Mandan, Mahadevtar, Mahankal Chaur, Mahendra Jyoti, Majhi Pheda, Malpi, Mangaltar, Milche, Nagre Gagarche, Nala, Nasiksthan Sanga, Nayagaun Deupur, Phalante Bhumlu, Phalametar, Phoksingtar, Pokhari Chaunri, Pokhari Narayansthan, Ravi Opi, Rayale, Saldhara, Salle Bhumlu, Salmechakala, Sankhu Patichaur, Sanowangthali, Saping, Sharada Batase, Sarmathali, Sarasyunkharka, Sathighar Bhagawati, Shikar Ambote, Simalchaur Shyampati, Simthali, Sipali Chilaune, Subbagaun, Sunthan, Thaukhal, Thulo Parsal, Tukucha Nala, Ugratara Janagal

Lalitpur District
Ashrang, Bhardev, Bhattedanda, Bukhel, Chandanpur, Chaughare, Dalchoki, Devichaur, Ghusel, Durlung, Gimdi, Gotikhel, Ikudol, Kaleshwar, Malta, Manikhel, Nallu, Pyutar, Sankhu, Thuladurlung, Badikhel, Bisankhunarayan, Bungamati, Chhampi, Chapagaon, Dhapakhel, Dukuchhap, Godamchaur, Godawari, Harisiddhi, Imadol, Jharuwarasi, Khokana, Lamatar, Lele, Lubhu, Sainbu, Siddhipur, Sunakothi, Thecho, Thaiba, Tikathali, Chapa Gaon, Satdobato

Nuwakot District
Bageshwari, Balkumari, Barsunchet, Belkot, Beteni, Bhadratar, Bhalche, Budhasing, Bungtang, Charghare, Chaturale, Chaughada, Chauthe, Chhap, Dangsing, Deurali, Duipipal, Phikuri, Ganeshsthan, Gaunkharka, Gerkhu, Ghyangphedi, Gorsyang, Jiling, Kakani, Kalibas, Kalikahalde, Kalyanpur, Kaule, Khadag Bhanjyang, Kharanitar, Kholegaun Khanigaun, Kintang, Kumari, Lachyang, Likhu, Madanpur, Mahakali, Manakamana, Narjamandap, Okharpauwa, Panchkanya, Ralukadevi, Ratmate, Rautbesi, Salme, Samari, Samundradevi, Samundratar, Shikharbesi, Sikre, Sundaradevi, Sunkhani, Suryamati, Talakhu, Taruka, Thanapati, Thansing, Thaprek, Tupche, Urleni

Rasuwa District
Bhorle, Briddhim, Chilime, Dandagaun, Dhaibung, Gatlang, Goljung, Haku, Jibjibe, Laharepauwa, Langtang, Ramche, Saramthali, Syaphru, Thulogaun, Thuman, Timure, Yarsa

Sindhupalchok District
Atarpur, Badegau, Banskharka, Baramchi, Barhabise, Baruwa, Batase, Bhimtar, Bhote Namlang, Bhotsiba, Chaukati, Dhumthang, Dubarchaur, Gati, Ghorthali, Ghuskun, Gloche, Gumba, Gunsakot, Hagam, Haibung, Helambu, Ichok, Ikhu Bhanjyang, Jalbire, Jethal, Kalika, Karkhali, Katambas, Kiul, Kunchok, Langarche, Lisankhu, Listikot, Mahankal, Maneshwara, Mankha, Marming, Motang, Nawalpur, Pagretar, Palchok, Pangtang, Petaku, Phulping Katti, Phulpingdanda, Phulpingkot, Piskar, Ramche, Sangachok, Selang, Sipa Pokhare, Sipal Kabhre, Sunkhani, Syaule Bazar, Tatopani, Tauthali, Tekanpur, Thakani, Thampal Chhap, Thangpalkot, Thokarpa, Thulo Dhading, Thulo Pakhar, Thulo Siruwari, Thum Pakhar, Timpul Ghyangul, Yamanadanda

Narayani Zone

Bara District
Amarpatti, Amlekhganj, Amritganj, Avab, Babuain, Bachhanpurwa, Badaki Phulbariya, Bagadi, Bahuari, Balirampur, Bandhuwan, Banjariya, Barainiya, Bariyarpur, Basantapur, Batara, Beldari, Benauli, Bhagwanpur, Bhaluwai Arwaliya, Bhatauda, Bhaudaha, Bhuluhi Marwaliya, Bishnupur, Bishnupurwa, Bishrampur, Biswambharpur, Brahmapuri, Buniyad, Chhatawa, Dahiyar, Dewapur, Dharmanagar, Dohari, Gadhahal, Ganj Bhawanipur, Golaganj, Haraiya, Hardiya, Hariharpur, Inarwamal, Inarwasira, Itiyahi, Jhitakaiya, Jitpur, Kabahigoth, Kabahijabdi, Kachorwa, Karaiya, Khopawa, Khutwajabdi, Kudawa, Lakshmipur Kotwali, Lipanimal, Madhurijabdi, Mahendra Adarsha, Maheshpur, Maini, Majhariya, Manaharwa, Matiarwa, Motisar, Naktuwa, Narahi, Pakadiya Chikani, Parsurampur, Paterwa, Patharhati, Pathora, Pheta, Piparpati Ek, Piparpati Dui, Piparpati Jabdi, Piparpati Parchrauwa, Pipra Basantapur, Piprabirta, Pipradhi Goth, Prasauni, Prastoka, Purainiya, Raghunathpur, Rampur Tokani, Rampurwa, Rauwahi, Srinagar Bairiya, Sihorwa, Sinhasani, Sisahaniya, Tedhakatti, Telkuwa, Terariya, Uchidiha, Umarjan

Former VDC: Pipara Simara, Jitpur Bhawanipur, Chhata Pipra, Phattepur, Dumbarwana, Ratnapuri, Bharatganj Singaul, Kakadi, Kolhabi, Prasona, Sapahi

Chitwan District
Ayodhyapuri, Bachhayauli, Bagauda, Bhandara, Birendranagar, Chandi Bhanjyang, Dahakhani, Darechok, Dibyanagar, Gardi, Gitanagar, Jagatpur, Jutpani, Kabilas, Kathar, Kaule, Korak, Lothar, Madi Kalyanpur, Mangalpur, Meghauli, Narayanpur, Padampur, Pancha Kanya, Parbatipur, Patihani, Phulbari, Piple, Pithuwa, Shaktikhor, Shivanagar, Siddi, Shukranagar
khairahani

Makwanpur District
Ambhanjyang, Bajrabarahi, Basamadi, Betini, Bhainse, Bharta Pundyadevi, Bhimphedi, Budhichaur, Chhatiwan, Chitlang, Churiyamai, Daman, Dandakharka, Dhimal, Gogane, Handikhola, Hatiya, Hurnamadi, Ipa Panchakanya, Kalikatar, Kankada, Khairang, Kogate, Kulekhani, Makwanpurgadhi, Manahari, Manthali, Markhu, Namtar, Nibuwatar, Padma Pokhari, Palung, Phakhel, Phaparbadi, Raigaun, Raksirang, Sarikhet Palase, Shikharpur, Sisneri Mahadevsthan, Sukaura, Thingan, Tistung Deurali

Parsa District
Alau, Amarpatti, Auraha, Bagahi, Bagbana, Bageshwari, Bahauri Pidari, Bahuarba Bhatha, Basadilwa, Basantapur, Belwa Parsauni, Beriya Birta, Bhawanipur, Bhedihari, Bhisawa, Bijbaniya, Bindyabasini, Biranchibarba, Biruwa Guthi, Bisrampur, Charani, Deukhana, Dhaubini, Gadi, Gamhariya, Ghoddauda Pipra, Ghore, Govindapur, Hariharpur, Hariharpur Birta, Harapataganj, Harpur, Jagarnathpur Sira, Jaimanglapur, Janikatala, Jhauwa Guthi, Jitpur, Kauwa Ban Kataiya, Lahawarthakari, Lakhanpur, Lal Parsa, Langadi, Lipani Birta, Madhuban Mathaul, Mahadevpatti, Mahuwan, Mainiyari, Mainpur, Mikhampur, Mirjapur, Mosihani, Mudali, Nagardaha, Nirchuta, Nirmal Basti, Pancharukhi, Parsauni Birta, Parsauni Matha, Patbari Tola-Warwa, Paterwa Sugauli, Pidariguthi, Pokhariya, Prasurampur, Ramgadhawa, Ramnagari, Sabaithawa, Sakhuwa Parsauni, Samjhauta, Shankar Saraiya, Sapauli, Sedhawa, Shiva Worga, Sirsiya Khalwatola, Sonbarsa, Srisiya, Subarnapur, Sugauli Birta, Sugauli Partewa, Surjaha, Thori, Tulsi Barba, Udayapur Dhurmi, Vauratar

Rautahat District
Ajagabi, Akolawa, Auraiya, Badharwa, Bagahi, Bahuwa Madanpur, Bairiya, Banjaraha, Bariyarpur, Basantapatti, Basantapur, Basbiti Jingadiya, Bhalohiya, Bhediyahi, Birtipraskota, Bishrampur, Bisunpurwa Manpur, Brahmapuri, Debahi, Dharampur, Dharhari, Dipahi, Dumriya, Balchanpur, Gadhi, Gamhariya Birta, Gamhariya Parsa, Gangapipra, Garuda Bairiya, Gedahiguthi, Gunahi, Hajminiya, Hardiya Paltuwa, Harsaha, Hathiyahi, Inarbari Jyutahi, Inaruwa, Jatahare, Jayanagar, Jethrahiya, Jhunkhunma, Jingadawa Belbichhwa, Jingadiya, Jowaha, Judibela, Kakanpur, Karkach Karmaiya, Karuniya, Katahariya, Khesarhiya, Lakshminiya, Lakshmipur, Lakshmipur Belbichhawa, Lokaha, Madanpur, Madhopur, Mahamadpur, Malahi, Maryadpur, Masedawa, Mathiya, Matsari, Mithuawa, Mudwalawa, Narkatiya Guthi, Pacharukhi, Pataura, Pathara Budharampur, Paurai, Phatuha Maheshpur, Pipariya, Pipra Bhagwanpur, Pipra Pokhariya, Pipra Rajbara, Pothiyahi, Pratappur Paltuwa, Prempur Gunahi, Purainawma, Raghunathpur, Rajdevi, Rajpur Pharhadawa, Rajpur Tulsi, Ramoli Bairiya, Rampur Khap, Rangapur, Sakhuwa, Sakhuwa Dhamaura, Samanpur, Sangrampur, Santapur, Santpur, Sarmujawa, Saruatha, Saunaraniya, Sawagada, Shitalpur Bairgania, Simara Bhawanipur, Sirsiya, Tejapakar, Tengraha, Tikuliya

Western Development Region

Gandaki Zone

Gorkha District
Aanppipal, Aaru Arbang, Aaru Chanuate, Aarupokhari, Asrang, Baguwa, Bakrang, Bhirkot, Bhumlichok, Bihi, Borlang, Bunkot, Chhaikampar, Chhoprak, Chumchet, Chyangli, Darbhung, Deurali, Dhawa, Dhuwakot, Gaikhur, Gakhu, Ghairung, Ghyachok, Ghyalchok, Gorakhkali, Gumda, Hansapur, Harbhi, Jaubari, Kashigaun, Kerabari, Kerauja, Kharibot, Khoplang, Laprak, Lapu, Lho, Makaising, Manakamana, Manbu, Masel, Muchhok, Namjung, Nareshwar, Palumtar, Panchkhuwadeurali, Pandrung, Phinam, Phujel, Prok, Ranishwara, Samagaun, Saurpani, Srinathkot, Simjung, Sirdibas, Swara, Taklung, Takukot, Takumajhalakuribot, Tandrang, Tanglichok, Taple, Tara Nagar, Thalajung, Thumi, Uiya, Warpak

Kaski District
Arba Vijaya, Armala, Garlang, Begnas, Bhachok, Bhadaure Tamagi, Bharat Pokhari, Chapakot, Dangsing, Deurali, Dhampus, Dhikure Pokhari, Dhital, Ghachok, Ghandruk, Hansapur, Hemaja, Kahun, Kalika, Kaskikot, Kristinachnechaur, Lahachok, Lamachaur, Lumle, Lwangghale, Machhapuchchhre, Majhthana, Mala, Mauja, Mijuredanda, Namarjung, Nirmalpokhari, Parche, Pumdibhumdi, Puranchaur, Rakhi, Ribhan, Rupakot, Saimarang, Salyan, Sarangkot, Sardikhola, Shisuwa, Siddha, Sildujure, Thumakodanda, Thumki, Bhalam

Lamjung District
Archalbot, Bahundanda, Bajhakhet, Balungpani, Bangre, Bansar, Bhalayakharka, Bharte, Bhoje, Bhorletar, Bhotewodar, Bhujung, Bhulbhule, Bichaur, Chakratirtha, Chandreshwar, Chiti, Dhamilikuwa, Dhodeni, Dhuseni, Dudhpokhari, Duradanda, Gauda, Ghanpokhara, Ghermu, Gilung, Hiletaksar, Ilampokhari, Ishaneshwar, Jita, Karapu, Khudi, Kolki, Kunchha, Maling, Mohoriyakot, Nalma, Nauthar, Neta, Pachok, Parewadanda, Pasagaun, Phaleni, Puranokot, Pyarjung, Rangha, Samibhanjyang, Srimanjyang, Simpani, Sindure, Sundarbazar, Suryapal, Taghring, Tandrang, Tarku, Tarkughat, Uttarkanya

Manang District
Bagarchhap, Bhakra, Chame, Dharapani, Ghyaru, Khangsar, Manang, Nar, Nyawal, Pisang, Phu, Tachi Bagarchhap, Tanki Manang, Thoche

Syangja District
Almadevi, Arjun Chaupari, Aruchaur, Arukharka, Bagephatake, Bahakot, Banethok Deurali, Bhatkhola, Bichari Chautara, Birgha Archale, Biruwa Archale, Chandi Bhanjyang, Chandikalika, Chhangchhangdi, Chilaunebas, Chimnebas, Chisapani, Chitre Bhanjyang, Darsing Dahathum, Dhanubase, Dhapuk Simal Bhanjyang, Ganeshpur, Iladi, Jagat Bhanjyang, Jagatradevi, Kalikakot, Karendanda, Kolma Barahachaur, Keware Bhanjyang, Khilung Deurali, Kichnas, Kyakami, Majhakot Sivalaya, Malengkot, Manakamana, Nibuwakharka, Oraste, Pakbadi, Panchamul, Pauwegaude, Pekhuwa Baghakhor, Pelakot, Pelkachaur, Phaparthum, Phedikhola, Pindikhola, Rangvang, Rapakot, Sakhar, Daraun, Satupasal, Sekham, Setidobhan, Srikrishna Gandaki, Sirsekot, Sorek, Taksar, Thuladihi, Thumpokhara, Tindobate, Tulsibhanjyang, Wangsing Deurali, Yaladi

Tanahu District
Ambukhaireni, Arunodaya, Baidi, Barbhanjyang, Basantapur, Bhanu, Bhanumati, Bhimad, Bhirkot, Bhirlung, Chhang, Chhimkeshwari, Chhipchhipe, Chok Chisapani, Deurali, Devghat, Dharampani, Gajarkot, Ghansikuwa, Jamune Bhanjyang, Kabilas, Kahu Shivapur, Keshavtar, Kihun, Kota, Kotdarbar, Kyamin, Majhakot, Manpang, Phirphire, Pokhari Bhanjyang, Purkot, Raipur, Ramjakot, Ranipokhari, Risti, Rupakot, Samungbhagawati, Satiswara, Sundhara, Syamgha, Tanahunsur, Thaprek,

Lumbini Zone

Arghakhanchi District
Adguri, Arghatos, Asurkot, Balkot, Bangi, Bhagawati, Chhatraganj, Chidika, Dhakawang, Dhanchaur, Dharapani, Dhatiwang, Dhikura, Gorkhunga, Hansapur, Jukena, Juluke, Kerunga, Khan, Khandaha, Khidim, Khilji, Maidan, Mareng, Nuwakot, Pali, Panena, Pathauti, Pathona, Pokharathok, Siddhara, Simalapani, Sitapur, Subarnakhal, Thada, Thulo Pokhara

Gulmi District
Aaglung, Amararwathok, Amarpur, Apchaur, Arbani, Arje, Arkhawang, Arlangkot, Aslewa, Badagaun, Bajhketeri, Baletaksar, Balithum, Bamgha, Bami, Bastu, Bhanbhane, Bhangari, Bharse, Bhurmung, Birbas, Bisukharka, Chhapahile, Dalamchaur, Darbar Devisthan, Darling, Daungha, Dhamir, Dhurkot Bastu, Dhurkot Bhanbhane, Dhurkot Nayagaun, Dhurkot Rajasthal, Digam, Dirbung, Dohali, Dubichaur, Dusma Rajasthal, Gaidakot, Gurukot Rajasthal, Gwadha, Gwadi, Hadahade, Hadinete, Hansara, Harewa, Harmichaur, Harrachaur, Hasara, Hastichaur, Hawangdi, Hunga, Jaisithok, Jayakhani, Johang, Juniya, Jubhung, Khadgakot, Kharjyang, Kurgha, Limgha, Malagiri, Marbhung, Musikot, Myal Pokhari, Nayagaun, Neta, Palkikot, Paralmi, Paudi Amarahi, Pipaldhara, Phoksing, Purkot Daha, Purtighat, Rimuwa, Rupakot, Ruru, Shantipur, Siseni, Thanpati, Thulo Lumpek, Turang, Wagla, Wamitaksar

Kapilvastu District
Abhirawa, Ajingara, Bahadurganj, Jamuni, Sukharampur, Balarampur, Baluhawa, Bangai, Banganga, Baraipur, Barakulpur, Basantapur, Baskhaur, Bedauli, Bhagawanpur Choti, Bhalabari, Bijuwa, Bithuwa, Budhi, Dhankauli, Dharampaniya, Dohani, Dubiya, Dumara, Gajehada, Ganeshpur, Gauri, Gotihawa, Gugauli, Haranampur, Hardauna, Hariharpur, Hathausa, Hathihawa, Jahadi, Jayanagar, Kajarhawa, Khurhuriya, Kopawa, Kushawa, Labani, Lalpur, Maharajganj, Mahendrakot, Mahuwa, Malwar, Manpur, Milmi, Motipur, Nanda Nagar, Nigalihawa, Pakadi, Parsohiya, Patariya, Patna, Patthardaihiya, Phulika, Pipari, Purusottampur, Rajpur, Ramghat, Ramnagar, Rangapur, Sauraha, Shivagadhi, Singhkhor, Sisawa, Shivapur Palta, Somdiha, Taulihawa, Thunhiya, Tilaurakot, Titirkhi, Udayapur, Vidhya Nagar

Nawalparasi District
Amarapuri, Amraut, Badahara Dubauliya, Baidauli, Banjariya, Benimanipur, Bharatipur, Bhujhawa, Bulingtar, Dadajheri Tadi, Dawanne Devi, Dedgaun, Deurali, Devagawa, Dhobadi, Dhurkot, Dumkibas, Gairami, Guthi Parsauni, Guthisuryapura, Hakui, Harpur, Humsekot, Jahada, Jamuniya, Jamuwad, Jaubari, Kolhuwa, Kotathar, Kudiya, Kumarwarti, Kusma, Mainaghat, Manari, Manjhariya, Mithukaram, Mukundapur, Naram, Narsahi, Naya Belhani, Pakalihawa, Palhi, Parasi, Parsauni, Pratappur, Rajahar, Rakachuli, Rakuwa, Ramnagar, Rampur Khadauna, Rampurwa, Ratnapur, Ruchang, Rupauliya, Sanai, Sarawal, Somani, Sukrauli, Suryapura, Swathi, Tamasariya, Thulo Khairatawa, Tilakpur, Tribenisusta, Unwach, Upallo Arkhale

Palpa District
Archale, Argali, Bahadurpur, Baldengadhi, Bandi Pokhara, Barandi, Bhairabsthan, Bhuwan Pokhari, Birkot, Bodhapokharathok, Boudhagumba, Chappani, Chhahara, Chidipani, Chirtungdhara, Darchha, Darlamdanda, Deurali, Devinagar, Dobhan, Gadakot, Galgha, Gegha, Gothadi, Haklang, Humin, Hungi, Jalpa, Jhadewa, Jhirubas, Juthapauwa, Jyamire, Kachal, Kaseni, Khaliban, Khaniban, Khanichhap, Khanigau, Khasyoli, Khyaha, Koldada, Kusumkhola, Madanpokhara, Mainadi, Masyam, Mityal, Mujhung, Narayanmatales, Palung Mainadi, Phek, Phoksingkot, Pipaldada, Pokharathok, Rahabasy, Ringneraha, Rupse, Sahalkot, Satyawati, Siddheshwar, Siluwa, Somadi, Tahu, Telgha, Thu, Timurekha, Wakamalang, Yangha

Rupandehi District
Aama, Amari, Amawa Marchawar, Amuwa Paschim, Asurena, Babhani, Bagaha, Bagauli, Bairghat, Balarampur, Bangai, Bangai Marchwar, Baragadewa, Barsauli, Basantapur, Betakuiya, Bisunpura, Bodabar, Bogadi, Chhipagada, Chhotaki Ramnaga, Chilhiya, Dayanagar, Dhakadhai, Dhamauli, Dudharakchhe, Gajedi, Gangoliya, Gonaha, Hanaiya, Hati Bangai, Hati Pharsatika, Jogada, Kamahariya, Kuttwa, Karauta, Karmahawa, Kataya, Kerbani, Khadawa Bangai, Mainahiya, Man Materiya, Man Pakadi, Maryadpur, Motipur, Padsari, Pajarkatli, Pakadi Sakron, Parroha, Parsa, Patekhauli, Pharena, Pharsatikar, Pharsatikarhati, Piprahawa, Pokharvindi, Rayapur, Roinihawa, Rudrapur, Sadi, Saljhundi, Samera Marchwar, Semalar, Sikatahan, Silautiya, Sipawa, Sauraha Pharsatikar, Suryapura, Tama Nagar, Tarkulaha, Tharki, Thumhawa Piprahawa

Daulagiri Zone

Baglung District
Adhikarichaur, Amalachaur, Amarbhumi, Argal, Arjewa, Baskot, Batakachaur, Bhakunde, Bhimgithe, Bhimpokhara, Bihunkot, Binamare, Boharagaun, Bowang, Bungadovan, Burtibang, Chhisti, Daga Tundada, Damek, Darling, Devisthan, Dhamja, Baglung Jaidi, Dhullubaskot, Dudilavati, Gwalichaur-Harichaur, Hatiya, Hila, Hudgishir, Jaljala, Kandebas, Khungkhani, Khunga, Kusmishera, Lekhani, Malika, Malma, Mulpani, Narayansthan, Narethanti, Nisi, Paiyunthanthap, Palakot, Pandavkhani, Paiyunpata, Rajkut, Ranasingkiteni, Rangkhani, Rayadanda, Resha, Righa, Salyan, Sarkuwa, Singana, Sisakhani, Sukhura, Sunkhani, Taman, Tangram, Tara, Tityang

Mustang District
Charang, Chhonhup, Chhoser, Chhusang, Dhami, Jomsom, Jhong, Kagbeni, Kowang, Kunjo, Lete, Lo Manthang, Marpha, Muktinath, Surkhang, Tukuche

Myagdi District
Arman, Arthunge, Babiyachaur, Baranja, Begkhola, Bhakilmi, Bima, Chimkhola, Dagnam, Dana, Darwang, Devisthan, Dhatan, Dowa, Gurja Khani, Histhan Mandali, Jhin, Jyamrukot, Kuhunkot, Kuinemangale, Lulang, Malkwang, Marang, Mudi, Muna, Narchyang, Niskot, Okharbot, Pakhapani, Patlekhet, Pulachaur, Rakhu Bhagawati, Rakhupiple, Ramche, Ratnechaur, Rumaga, Shikha, Singa, Takam, Tatopani

Parbat District
Arthar Dadakharka, Bachchha, Bahaki Thanti, Bajung, Balakot, Banau, Baskharka, Behulibans, Bhangara, Bhoksing, Bhorle, Bhuk Deurali, Bhuktangle, Bihadi Barachaur, Bihadi Ranipani, Bitalawa Pipaltari, Chitre, Deupurkot, Deurali, Devisthan, Dhairing, Hosrangdi, Huwas, Karkineta, Khola Lakuri, Kurgha, Kyang, Lekhphant, Limithana, Mahashila Gaupalika, Mallaj Majhfant, Mudikuwa, Nagliwang, Pakhapani, Pangrang, Phalamkhani, Phalebas Devisthan, Phalebas Khanigaun, Ramja Deurali, Saligram, Salija, Saraukhola, Shankar Pokhari, Taklak, Tanglekot, Thana Maulo, Thapathana, Thuli Pokhari, Tilahar, Tribeni, Urampokharapakuwa

Mid-Western Development Region

Rapti Zone

Dang Deukhuri District
Amritpur, Baghmare, Bela, Bijauri, Chailahi, Dhanauri, Dharna, Dhikpur, Diruwa, Gadhawa, Gangapraspur, Gobardiya, Goltakuri, Halwar, Hansipur, Hapur, Hekuli, Kabhre, Koilabas, Lalmitiya, Lakshmipur, Loharpani, Manpur, Narayanpur, Panchakule, Pawan Nagar, Phulbari, Purandhara, Rajpur, Rampur, Saidha, Satbariya, Saudiyar, Shantinagar, Srigaun, Sisahaniya, Sonpur, Syuja, Tarigaun, Urahari

Pyuthan District
Arkha, Badikot, Bangemarkot, Bangesal, Baraula, Barjibang, Belbas, Bhingri, Bijaya Nagar, Bijuwar, Bijuli, Chuja, Dakhanwadi, Damri, Dangbang, Dharamawati, Dharampani, Dhobaghat, Dhubang, Dungegadi, Gothibang, Hansapur, Jumrikanda, Khaira, Khabang, Khung, Kochibang, Ligha, Libang, Lung, Majhakot, Maranthana, Markabang, Narikot, Naya Gaun, Okharkot, Pakala, Phopli, Puja, Pythan, Rajbara, Ramdi, Ruspur Kot, Sari, Swargadwarikhal, Syaulibang, Tarwang, Tiram, TusaraNineukharka

Rolpa District
Aresh, Bhawang, Mirul, Budagaun, Dhawang, Dubidanda, Dubring, Eriwang, Phagam, Gam, Gajul, Gaurigaun, Gharti Gaun, Ghodagaun, Gumchal, Harjang, Jailwang, Jaimakasala, Jankot, Jauli Pokhari, Jedwang, Jhenam, Jinawang, Jungar, Karchawang, Kareti, Khumel, Khungri, Kotgaun, Kureli, Liwang, Masina, Mijhing, Nuwagaun, Pachhawang, Pakhapani, Pang, Rangkot, Rangsi, Rank, Sakhi, Seram, Sirpa, Siuri, Talawang, Tewang, Thawang, Uwa, Wadachaur, Whama, Wot

Rukum District
Aathbis Danda, Aathbis Kot, Arma, Bapsekot, Bhalakachha, Chaurjahari, Chhiwang, Chokhawang, Chunwang, Duli, Garayala, Gautamkot, Ghetma, Hukam, Jang, Jhula, Kanda, Kankri, Khara, Kholagaun, Kol, Kotjahari, Magma, Mahat, Morawang, Muru, Musikot Khalanga, Nuwakot, Pipal, Pokhara, Purtim Kanda, Pwang, Pyaugha, Rangsi, Ranmamekot, Rugha, Simli, Sisne, Sobha, Syalagadi, Syalapakha, Taksera

Salyan District
Badagaun, Baphukhola, Bajh Kanda, Bame Banghad, Bhalchaur, Chande, Chhayachhetra, Damachaur, Darmakot, Devisthal, Dhagari Pipal, Dhakadam, Dhanwang, Jhimpe, Jimali, Kabhrechaur, Kalagaun, Kalimati Kalche, Kalimati Rampur, Kabhra, Korbang Jhimpe, Kotbara, Kotmala, Kubhinde, Lakshmipur, Lekhpokhara, Majh Khanda, Marmaparikhanda, Mulkhola, Nigalchula, Phalawang, Pipal Neta, Rim, Sarpani Garpa, Sibaratha, Siddheshwar, Sinwang, Suikot, Tharmare, Tribeni

Karnali Zone

Dolpa District
Bhijer, Chharka, Dho, Dunai, Juphal, Kaigaun, Kalika, Khadang, Lawan, Likhu, Majhphal, Mukot, Narku, Pahada, Phoksundo, Raha, Rimi, Sahartara, Saldang, Sarmi, Sunhu, Tinje, Tripurakot

Humla District
Barai, Bargaun, Chhipra, Darma,, Dandaphaya, Gothi, Hepka, Jaira, Kalika, Khagalgaun, Kharpunath, Lali, Limi, Madana, Maila, Melchham, Mimi, Muchu, Raya, Rodikot, Sarkideu, Saya, Srinagar, Srimastha, Simikot, Syada, Thehe,

Jumla District
Badki, Birat, Bamramadichaur, Chhumchaur, Depalgaun, Dhapa, Dillichaur, Garjyangkot, Ghode Mahadev, Gothichaur, Haku, Kalikakhetu, Kanakasundari, Labhra, Lihi, Mahabe Pattharkhola, Mahadev, Malika Bota, Malikathota, Narakot, Pandawagupha, Patarasi, Patmara, Sanigaun, Tamti, Tatopani

Kalikot District
Badalkot, Chhapre, Chilkhaya, Daha, Dholagohe, Gela, Jubika, Khin, Kotbada, Kumalgaun, Lalu, Marta, Mehal Madi, Mugraha, Mumra, Nanikot, Odanku, Pakha, Phoi Mahadev, Phukot, Raku, Ramanakot, Ranchuli, Rupsa, Sipkhana, Siuna, Sukitaya, Thirpu

Mugu District
Bhiyi, Dhainakot, Dolphu, Ghaina, Gumtha, Hyanglung, Jima, Kale, Karkibada, Kimari, Kotdanda, Mangri, Mihi, Mugu, Natharpu, Photu, Pina, Pulu, Rara, Rara Kalai, Rowa, Ruga, Rumale, Seri, Srikot, Srinagar, Sukhadhik

Bheri Zone

Banke District
Bageshwari, Banakatawa, Banakatti, Basudevapur, Bejapur, Belahari, Belbhar, Betahani, Bhawaniyapur, Binauna, Chisapani, Ganapur, Gangapur, Hirminiya, Holiya, Indrapur, Jaispur, Kalaphanta, Kamdi, Kanchanpur, Kathkuiya, Khajura Khurda, Khaskarkando, Khaskusma, Lakshmanpur, Mahadevpuri, Manikapur, Matahiya, Narainapur, Naubasta, Parsapur, Phattepur, Piparhawa, Puraina, Puraini, Radhapur, Rajhena, Raniyapur, Saigaun, Samserganj, Sitapur, Sonapur, Titahiriya, Udarapur, Udayapur

Bardiya District
Baganaha, Baniyabhar, Belawa, Deudakala, Dhadhawar, Dhodhari, Gola, Jamuni, Kalika, Khairapur, Khairi Chandanpur, Magaragadi, Mahamadpur, Manau, Manpur Mainapokhar, Manpur Tapara, Mathurahardwar, Motipur, Neulapur, Padanaha, Pashupatinagar, Patabhar, Sanesri, Shivapur, Sorhawa, Suryapatawa, Taratal, Thakudwara

Dailekh District
Awal Parajul, Bada Bhairab, Bada Khola, Baluwatar, Bansi, Baraha, Basantamala, Belaspur, Belpata, Bhawani, Bindhyabasini, Bisalla, Chamunda, Chauratha, Dada Parajul, Gamaudi, Gauri, Goganpani, Jagannath, Jambukandh, Kal Bhairab, Kalika, Kasikandh, Katti, Khadkawada, Kharigera, Kusapani, Lakhandra, Lakuri, Lalikhanda, Lyati Bindraseni, Mairi Kalikathum, Malika, Moheltoli, Nomule, Odhari, Pagnath, Piladi, Pipalkot, Rakam Karnali, Raniban, Rawalkot, Rum, Salleri, Santalla, Saraswati, Seri, Sigaudi, Singasain, Tilepata, Tilijaisi, Toli

Jajarkot District
Archhani, Bhagawati Tol, Bhur, Daha, Dandagaun, Dasera, Dhime, Garkhakot, Jagatipur, Jhapra, Junga Thapachaur, Karkigaun, Khagenkot, Khalanga, Kortrang, Lahai, Majhkot, Nayakwada, Paink, Pajaru, Punama, Ragda, Ramidanda, Rokayagaun, Sakala, Salma, Sima, Suwanauli, Talegaun, Thala Raikar

Surkhet District
Agragaun, Awalaching, Bajedichaur, Betan, Bidyapur, Bijaura, Chapre, Chhinchu, Dabiyachaur, Dahachaur, Dandakhali, Dasarathpur, Dharapani, Gadi Bayalkada, Garpan, Ghatgaun, Ghoreta, Ghumkhahare, Gumi, Guthu, Hariharpur, Jarbuta, Kaphalkot, Kalyan, Kaprichaur, Khanikhola, Kunathari, Lagam, Latikoili, Lekhpharsa, Lekhgaun, Lekhparajul, Maintada, Malarani, Matela, Mehelkuna, Neta, Pamka, Pokharikanda, Rajeni, Rakam, Ramghat, Ranibas, Ratu, Sahare, Salkot, Satokhani, Taranga, Tatopani, Uttarganga

Far-Western Development Region

Seti Zone

Achham District
Babala, Bannatoli, Baradadivi, Basti, Batulasen, Bayala, Bhairavsthan, Bhatakatiya, Bhuli, Binayak, Bindhyawasini, Birpath, Budhakot, Chalsa, Chapamandau, Chhatara, Darna, Devisthan, Dhakari, Dhaku, Dhamali, Dharaki, Dhodasain, Dhudharukot, Dhungachalna, Dumi, Gajara, Hatikot, Hichma, Janalikot, Kalagaun, Kalekanda, Kalika, Kalikasthan, Khaptad, Khodasadevi, Kuika, Kushkot, Layati, Lungra, Malatikot, Marku, Mashtanamdali, Nada, Nandegata, Patalkot, Payal, Pulletala, Rahaph, Ramarosan, Raniban, Risidaha, Sakot, Santada, Sera, Siudi, Sutar, Tadigaira, Thanti, Timilsain, Toli, Tosi, Tumarkhad, Walant, Warla

Bajhang District
Banjh, Bhairab Nath, Bhamchaur, Bhatekhola, Byasi, Chaudhari, Dahabagar, Dangaji, Dantola, Daulichaur, Deulekh, Deulikot, Dhamena, Gadaraya, Kadel, Kailash, Kalukheti, Kanda, Kaphalaseri, Khiratadi, Koiralakot, Kot Bhairab, Kotdewal, Lamatola, Lekhgaun, Majhigaun, Malumela, Mashdev, Matela, Maulali, Melbisauni, Parakatne, Patadewal, Pauwagadhi, Pipalkot, Rayal, Rilu, Sainpasela, Sunikot, Sunkuda, Surma, Syandi

Bajura District
Atichaur, Baddhu, Bai, Barhabise, Bichhiya, Bramhatola, Budhiganga, Chhatara, Dahakot, Dogadi, Gotri, Gudukhati, Jagannath, Jayabageshwari, Jugada, Kailashmandau, Kanda, Kolti, Kotila, Kuldeumandau, Manakot, Martadi, Pandusain, Rugin, Sappata, Tolodewal

Doti District
Banalek, Banja Kakani, Barchhen, Basudevi, Bhawardanda, Bhadhegaun, Bhumirajmandau, Changra, Chhapali, Chhatiwan, Dahakalikasthan, Daud, Dhanglagaun, Dhirkamandau, Durgamandau, Gadasera, Gaguda, Gaihragaun, Ganjari, Ghanteshwar, Girichauka, Jijodamandau, Kadamandau, Kalena, Kalikasthan, Kanachaur, Kapalleki, Kedar Akhada, Khatiwada, Khirsain, Ladagada, Lamikhal, Lana Kedareshwar, Latamandau, Lakshminagar, Mahadevsthan, Mannakapadi, Mudabhara, Mudhegaun, Nirauli, Pachanali, Pokhari, Ranagaun, Sanagaun, Saraswatinagar, Satphari, Simchaur, Tijali, Tikha, Tikhatar, Toleni, Wagalek, Warpata

Kailali District
Basauti, Bhajani, Boniya, Chaumala, Dansinhapur, Darakh, Dododhara, Durgauli, Gadariya, Godawari, Hasuliya, Janakinagar, Joshipur, Khailad, Khairala, Kota Tulsipur, Lalbojhi, Masuriya, Mohanyal, Munuwa, Narayanpur, Nigali, Pahalmanpur, Pandaun, Pawera, Phulbari, Pratapur, Ramsikhar Jhala, Ratnapur, Sadepani, Sahajpur, Sugarkhal, Thapapur, Udasipur, Urma

Mahakali Zone

Baitadi District
Amchaur, Barakot, Basantapur, Basuling, Bhatana, Bhumeshwar, Bijayapur, Bilaspur, Bumiraj, Chadeu, Chaukham, Dehimandau, Deulek, Dhikarim, Dhikasintad, Dhungad, Dilasaini, Rim, Durga Bhabani, Durgasthan, Gajari, Giregada, Gokuleshwar, Gujar, Gurukhola, Gwallek, Hat, Hatraj, Jogannath, Kaipal, Kataujpani, Khalanga, Kotila, Kotpetara, Kulau, Kuwakot, Mahadevsthan, Mahakali, Maharudra, Malladehi, Mathraj, Maunali, Melauli, Nagarjun, Nwadeu, Nwali, Pancheshwar, Patan, Raudidewal, Rauleshwar, Rudreshwar, Sakar, Salena, Sankar, Sarmali, Shibanath, Shikharpur, Shivaling, Srikedar, Siddhapur, Siddheshwar, Sikash, Silanga, Srikot, Talladehi, Thalakanda, Thalegada, Tripurasundari, Udayadeb

Dadeldhura District
Ajayameru, Alital, Ashigram, Bagarkot, Belapur, Bhadrapur, Bhageshwar, Bhumiraj, Chipur, Dewal Dibyapur, Dhatal, Ganeshpur, Gankhet, Jogbuda, Kailapalmandau, Khalanga, Koteli, Manilek, Mashtamandau, Nawadurga, Rupal, Sahastralinga, Samaiji, Sirsha

Darchula District
Bhagawati, Boharigau, Byans, Dadakot, Datu, Dethala, Dhari, Dhaulakot, Dhuligada, Eyarkot, Ghusa, Gokuleshwar, Gulijar, Gwami, Hikila, Hunainath, Huti, Khandeshwari, Khar, Kharkada, Lali, Latinath, Malikarjun, Pipalchauri, Ralpa, Ranisikhar, Rithachaupata, Sankarpur, Seri, Sharmauli, Sikhar, Sipti, Sitaula, Sunsera, Tapoban, Uku

Kanchanpur District
Baise Bichawa, Beldandi, Chandani, Daiji, Dekhatbhuli, Dodhara, Jhalari, Krishnapur, Pipaladi, Raikawar Bichawa, Rauteli Bichawa, Sankarpur, Suda

See also

Development Regions of Nepal
List of districts of Nepal
List of provinces of Nepal
List of zones of Nepal

References

Village development committees (Nepal)
Local government in Nepal
Subdivisions of Nepal
Lists of subdivisions of Nepal

1990 establishments in Nepal
2017 disestablishments in Nepal